The First Battle of Durazzo was a naval battle of World War I. It was fought off Durazzo, Albania at the end of December 1915 and involved the navies of Austria-Hungary, the United Kingdom, Italy, and France.

Battle
In December 1915, the Austro-Hungarian Navy sent another cruiser squadron into the Adriatic, this time to interfere with the Serbian Campaign. The new light cruiser (nine 4-inch main guns) —accompanied by five s—left Cattaro and headed for Durazzo late on 28 December 1915, with the submarine  and two destroyers already off Durazzo on patrol.

While on passage, the Austro-Hungarians sighted the French submarine  on patrol to the south of Cattaro. The destroyer  opened fire before ramming and sinking Monge.

Early the next day, the Austrian squadron arrived off Durazzo and opened fire on the town, with Helgoland sinking a Greek steamer and two schooners. The Austrian force now returned slowly north.

Allied forces in Brindisi were alerted to the Austrian force, and the British light cruiser  and the Italian scout cruiser , escorted by five French destroyers, sortied in an attempt to cut off the Austro-Hungarian ships from their base at Cattaro. These were followed two hours later by the Italian scout cruiser , the British light cruiser  and four Italian destroyers.

The Austrians also responded and despatched from Cattaro the armoured cruiser Kaiser Karl VI, and the light cruisers Novara and Aspern, to support the returning survivors of the raid, but they did not see action.

Early in the afternoon of 29 December, the forward Allied ships came into action with the Austrian squadron which was still only halfway home. The French destroyers headed for the already crippled Austrian destroyer Triglav and sank her before attempting to rejoin the British and Italian cruisers.

Meanwhile, the Allied cruisers attempted to cut off and deal with Helgoland and the three remaining destroyers. In a long-range gunnery duel fought throughout the afternoon, Helgoland skillfully avoided the Allied cruisers and reached Cattaro safely but with the loss of the valuable Lika and Triglav. Tatra suffered a damaged engine from several shell hits.

See also
 Mediterranean naval engagements during World War I
 Otranto Barrage

Bibliography
 
 
 

Naval battles of World War I involving Austria-Hungary
Naval battles of World War I involving France
Naval battles of World War I involving Italy
Naval battles of World War I involving the United Kingdom
Mediterranean naval operations of World War I
1915 in Austria-Hungary
Durazzo
1915 in France
Conflicts in 1915
December 1915 events